Jean Dauven (3 November 1900 – 14 July 1990) was a French bobsledder who competed in the 1930s. He finished ninth in the four-man event at the 1936 Winter Olympics in Garmisch-Partenkirchen. Dauven later became a sports journalist in the French newspaper Le Figaro. Despite he worked in a conservative newspaper, he argued for the progressive policy of the Front populaire and Léo Lagrange. He also was a writer about bobsleigh, writing a book Bolides des glace (bobsleigh) in 1944.

References

1936 bobsleigh four-man results
1936 Olympic Winter Games official report. - p. 415.
Book listing by Dauvon

1900 births
1990 deaths
Bobsledders at the 1936 Winter Olympics
French male bobsledders
French male writers
Olympic bobsledders of France
20th-century French male writers